Hovdenak is a Norwegian surname. Notable people with the surname include:

Hilde Hovdenak (born 1971), Norwegian long-distance runner
Nils Olaf Hovdenak (1854–1942), Norwegian politician
Olaf Hovdenak (1891–1929), Norwegian long-distance runner
Odd Hovdenak (1917–1982), Norwegian civil servant

Norwegian-language surnames